UB6 may refer to:

 UB6, a postcode district in the UB postcode area
 SM UB-6, World War I German submarine
 UB6, a grade of stainless steel, also known by other designations as grade 904L or 1.4539